Deri may refer to :

People
 Aryeh Deri (born 1959), an Israeli politician
 Frances Deri (1880–1971), an Austrian psychoanalyst 
 Miksa Déri (1854–1938), a Hungarian electrical engineer 
 Shlomo Deri (fl. 2000s),  an Israeli politician 
 Yehuda Deri (fl. 1990s/2000s), an Israeli rabbi

Other uses
 Deri, Caerphilly, a village in South Wales
Deri RFC, a rugby club
 Afon Deri, a river in Mid Wales
 Digital Enterprise Research Institute (DERI), Ireland

See also 

 Dari (disambiguation)